The St. David Formation is a geologic formation in Arizona. It preserves fossils.

See also

 List of fossiliferous stratigraphic units in Arizona
 Paleontology in Arizona

References
 

Geologic formations of Arizona